Portside Wharf is the international cruise terminal, residential and retail development at Hamilton, Brisbane, Queensland, Australia.

The Wharf is Brisbane's commercial international cruise terminal. It is also an upscale residential and retail precinct including restaurants, shops, a large fish shop/cafe, a supermarket, Dendy cinema complex and a public plaza. The precinct is commonly filled with tourists who arrive by ship, in addition to locals who often arrive by CityCat.

Brisbane Cruise Terminal 
The Brisbane Cruise Terminal was opened on 29 August 2006.
The $750 million development was completed by Multiplex. It is located on the north side of the Brisbane River upstream from the Gateway Bridge. The cruise ship terminal is capable of accommodating ships up to 270 metres in length. Cruise ships, super yachts and expedition ships dock at its international wharf on average once a week.

Due to Gateway Bridge height restrictions several larger cruise ships which are unable to pass under the bridge dock north of the bridge at Pinkenba Wharf or at the Multi-user Terminal at the Grain Berth, located at Fisherman Islands.

The Wharf was the Brisbane home for the P&O cruise ship Pacific Sun which was sold and scrapped in 2017. As of March 2010, the Brisbane Cruise Terminal catered for the Pacific Dawn which had the left the P&O fleet by 2020. The wharf had acted as an additional hub for the cruise ship. In its first year of operation, the cruise terminal hosted 55 ships, making Brisbane the second largest cruise port in Australia.

A draft plan to develop a new terminal at Pikenba, called the Brisbane International Cruise Terminal, was approved by the Brisbane City Council in March 2013 and opened in 2021.

Photo gallery

References

External links
Official Portside Wharf website

Tourist attractions in Brisbane
Brisbane River
Buildings and structures in Brisbane
2006 establishments in Australia
Buildings and structures completed in 2006
Passenger ship terminals
Redeveloped ports and waterfronts in Australia
Hamilton, Queensland